In a Whisper is a 2019 documentary film directed by Cuban filmmakers Patricia Pérez Fernández and Heidi Hassan.

Synopsis 
Hassan and Pérez Fernández have been friends since childhood, a bond that was cemented by a shared love of swimming. As adolescents, they turned their love of cinema into a filmmaking pursuit. However, their collaborative relationship was cut short, when Hassan made the decision to leave Cuba for a new life in Europe; eventually settling in Geneva and marrying a fellow Cuban ex-pat. While Pérez Fernández was left reeling by this, she later came to realise she herself could no longer stay in Cuba and relocated to Spain. Her journey was more tumultuous, taking several menial jobs and a failed marriage. Both were obsessed with documenting everything, and In A Whisper pulls these two halves together into a coherent narrative whole.

Awards 

 Guadalajara International Film Festival - Feature Length Documentary nominee, Ibero-America Competition (2020)
 Havana Film Festival - Best Documentary Coral Award (2019)
 IDFA - Award for Best Feature-Length Documentary (2019)

References

External links 

 

2019 films
2019 documentary films
Cuban documentary films
Films shot in Cuba
Films shot in France
Films shot in Spain
Films shot in Switzerland
2010s Spanish-language films